Events in 1949 in animation.

Events

January
 January 22: Tex Avery's cartoon Bad Luck Blackie premieres, produced by MGM. It marks the debut of a prototypical version of Spike the Bulldog.
 January 30: The first episode of Adventures of Pow Wow is broadcast.

February
 February 26: William Hanna and Joseph Barbera's Tom & Jerry cartoon Polka-Dot Puss, produced by MGM, premieres. It is the first cartoon to use the classic Tom & Jerry theme music as its intro, composed by Scott Bradley.

March
 March 24: 21st Academy Awards: The Tom & Jerry cartoon The Little Orphan wins the Academy Award for Best Animated Short.

April
 April 9: Bob McKimson's Bugs Bunny cartoon Rebel Rabbit premieres, produced by Warner Bros. Cartoons.

May
 May 13: Dallas Bower's Alice in Wonderland premieres which has stop-motion sequences by Lou Bunin.

June
 June 11: Tex Avery's classic short The House of Tomorrow premieres, produced by MGM.
 June 25: Chuck Jones' classic Bugs Bunny short Long-Haired Hare premieres, produced by Warner Bros. Cartoons.

July
 July 9: William Hanna and Joseph Barbera's Tom & Jerry cartoon Heavenly Puss premieres, produced by MGM.
 July 30: Tex Avery’s Doggone Tired premieres, produced by MGM.

August
 August 27: Bob McKimson's The Windblown Hare premieres, produced by Warner Bros. Cartoons which stars Bugs Bunny, the Big Bad Wolf and the Three Little Pigs.

September
 September 1: Crusader Rabbit becomes the first animated series directly made for television.
 September 17: Chuck Jones' Fast and Furry-ous premieres, produced by Warner Bros. Cartoons, which marks the debut of Wile E. Coyote and the Road Runner.

October
 October 1: William Hanna and Joseph Barbera's Love That Pup, produced by MGM, starring Tom & Jerry, is first released. It marks the debut of Tyke the pup.
 October 5: The Adventures of Ichabod and Mr. Toad, produced by the Walt Disney Company, premieres.
 October 8: Voice actor Mel Blanc loses a trial against animation producer Walter Lantz, whom he'd sued for unauthorized use of his voice and laugh for the character Woody Woodpecker. Blanc had voiced the character in his three first cartoons, before Warner Brothers took an exclusivity contract on him. However, Lantz had kept using audio recordings of Woody's laugh and had other actors imitate the voice. The judge rules that Blanc has no case since he didn't copyright Woody's voice. However, Lantz does settle the case out of court and pays him some compensation afterwards.

Specific date unknown
 Karel Zeman's Inspiration premieres.

Films released

 April 15 - The Emperor's Nightingale (Czechoslovakia)
 May 13 - Alice in Wonderland (France)
 August 22 - The Dynamite Brothers (Italy)
 October 5 - The Adventures of Ichabod and Mr. Toad (United States)
 December 22 - The Singing Princess (Italy)
 December 26 - Adventures of Esparadrapo (Spain)

Television series debuts

 January 30 - Adventures of Pow Wow debuts on WNBT-TV.
 August 1 - Crusader Rabbit debuts in syndication.
 September - Jim and Judy in Teleland debuts in syndication.

Births

January
 January 7: George Buza, Canadian actor (voice of Beast in X-Men, Grandpa Fantootsie in Franny's Feet, Chief Chirpa in Ewoks). 
 January 10: Thomas Chase Jones, American composer (Mister T, Disney Television Animation, Bionic Six, Visionaries: Knights of the Magical Light, DIC Entertainment, Little Nemo: Adventures in Slumberland, A Wish for Wings That Work, Hanna-Barbera, Captain Simian & the Space Monkeys, Salty's Lighthouse, The New Woody Woodpecker Show, ChalkZone, Warner Bros. Animation).

February
 February 2: Brent Spiner, American actor (voice of Puck in Gargoyles, Conan O'Brien in South Park: Bigger, Longer and Uncut, Dr. Gabriel Rylander in Generator Rex, Joker in Young Justice, Coach Mackey in Quantum Quest: A Cassini Space Odyssey, Dr. Noonien Soong, Gondola Jack, and Medic in Robot Chicken, Gall Trayvis in Star Wars Rebels, Silver Surfer in the Hulk and the Agents of S.M.A.S.H. episode "Fear Itself", Riddler in the Justice League Action episode "E. Nigma, Consulting Detective", Purple Man in The Avengers: Earth's Mightiest Heroes episode "Emperor Stark", Robots in The Simpsons episode "Them, Robot", himself in the Family Guy episode "Not All Dogs Go to Heaven").
 February 5: Bill Steinkellner, American screenwriter (The Lion King 1½, co-creator of Teacher's Pet).
 February 8: John Swartzwelder, American novelist and screenwriter (The Simpsons).
 February 10: Valri Bromfield, Canadian actress and comedienne (voice of Mary Hartless in Tiny Toon Adventures and Animaniacs, Molly in Camp Candy).
 February 18: Pat Fraley, American actor (voice of Krang, Casey Jones and Baxter Stockman in Teenage Mutant Ninja Turtles, Denver in Denver, the Last Dinosaur, Tuffy Smurf in The Smurfs, Mad Rabbid in Rabbids Invasion, Doughy Bunnington in Hanazuki: Full of Treasures, Ken Sparks in ChalkZone, Gwumpki in Quack Pack, Marshal Moo Montana in Wild West C.O.W.-Boys of Moo Mesa, Cousin Itt in The Addams Family, Wildcat in TaleSpin, Fireball in Saber Rider and the Star Sheriffs, the title character in BraveStarr, Max Ray in The Centurions, Eddie in Turbo Teen, Major Talbot in The Incredible Hulk, Bat-Mite in the Batman: The Animated Series episode "Deep Freeze", Karl in the What's New, Scooby-Doo? episode "Fright House of a Lighthouse", Gombo in The Legend of Korra episode "The Earth Queen", Beta Ray Bill in The Super Hero Squad Show episode "The Ballad of Beta Ray Bill!", Lance Thruster in The Fairly OddParents episode "Crash Nebula", Kublai Khan in the Time Squad episode "Kublai Khan't", Santa Claus in the My Life as a Teenage Robot episode "A Robot For All Seasons").
 February 19: Andy Heyward, American television producer, writer (Hanna-Barbera) and businessman (founder of Genius Brands, co-founder of DIC Entertainment).
 February 23: Judy Munsen, American composer (Peanuts).

March
 March 2: Gates McFadden, American actress and choreographer (voice of Beverly Crusher in the Star Trek: Prodigy episode "Kobayashi", herself in the Family Guy episode "Not All Dogs Go to Heaven").
 March 16: Victor Garber, Canadian actor (voice of Sinestro in Green Lantern: First Flight, Master Thundering Rhino in Kung Fu Panda 2, James Sr. in the Spirit Riding Free episode "Lucky and the Train Tycoon", Michael de Graff in The Simpsons episode "Portrait of a Lackey on Fire").
 March 17: Patrick Duffy, American actor (voice of Harold Hatchback in the Goof Troop episode "Buddy Building", Steve Trevor in the Justice League episode "The Savage Time").
 March 21: Eddie Money, American singer and songwriter (performed the theme song of Quack Pack, composed the tracks "Baby Hold On" which was used in the Bob's Burgers episode "O.T.: The Outside Toilet", and "Two Tickets to Paradise" which was used in The Simpsons episode "Homer Loves Flanders", and the King of the Hill episode "Enrique-cilable Differences"), (d. 2019).
 March 30: Ray Magliozzi, American radio host (voice of Clack Tappet in the Arthur episode "Pick a Car, Any Car", and Click and Clack's As the Wrench Turns, Dusty Rust-eze in Cars and Cars 3) and television writer (Click and Clack's As the Wrench Turns).

April
 April 2:
 Pamela Reed, American actress (voice of Ruth Powers in The Simpsons, Jay's No. 1 Fan in The Critic episode "Miserable").
 Ron Palillo, American actor (voice of Rubik in Rubik, the Amazing Cube, Ordinary Guy in the Darkwing Duck episode "Planet of the Capes", himself in the Duckman episode "Westward, No!"), (d. 2012).
 April 6: Tonino Accolla, Italian actor (dub voice of Homer Simpson in The Simpsons), (d. 2013).
 April 21: Patti LuPone, American actress and singer (voice of Yellow Diamond in the Steven Universe franchise, Nanpire in Vampirina, Roberta McCullough in Central Park, Nora Murphy in F is for Family, Cheryl Monroe in The Simpsons episode "The Girl on the Bus").
 April 24: Jim White, American voice actor (voice of Haredas in One Piece, the Narrator and Igneel in Fairy Tail, Marco in Fairy Gone, Zeke's Grandpa in Attack on Titan), (d. 2022).
 April 25: Augstí Ascensio Saurí, Spanish animator and comics artist (El mago de los sueños), (d. 1994).

May
 May 9: Billy Joel, American musician (voice of Dodger in Oliver & Company).
 May 20: Dave Thomas, Canadian actor, comedian and television writer (voice of Tuke in Brother Bear and Brother Bear 2, Doug McKenzie in Bob & Doug, Thunder-Karlsson in Pippi Longstocking, Lane Pratley in King of the Hill, Hugo in The Legend of Tarzan, Mr. Czelanski in Mission Hill, Harv Hickman and Ernst in Justice League, Agent Todd in Pound Puppies, Cleve Kelso in Fast & Furious Spy Racers, Rex Banner in The Simpsons episode "Homer vs. the Eighteenth Amendment", Pig Dad in the Nightmare Ned episode "Canadian Bacon", Tad Venom in the Duckman episode "The Longest Weekend", co-creator of Bob & Doug and Popzilla).
 May 21: Will Ryan, American actor, singer and musician (voice of Petrie in The Land Before Time, Willie the Giant in Mickey's Christmas Carol, House of Mouse, and Mickey Mouse Clubhouse, Scrooge McDuck in Sport Goofy in Soccermania, Pete in DuckTales and Mickey's Christmas Carol, Grubby in The Adventures of Teddy Ruxpin, The Seahorse Herald in The Little Mermaid, the title characters in the Courage the Cowardly Dog episode "The Duck Brothers", various characters in Hi Hi Puffy AmiYumi), (d. 2021).
 May 25: Yuki Katsuragi, Japanese singer (performed an insert song in Space Dandy and the theme songs for Goku Midnight Eye and Gon, the Little Fox), (d. 2022).
 May 26:
 Hank Williams Jr., American singer-songwriter and musician (singing voice of Injurin' Joe in Tom Sawyer, performed the song "Canyonero" in The Simpsons episodes "The Last Temptation of Krust" and "Marge Simpson in: "Screaming Yellow Honkers"").
 Arlene Klasky, American animator, graphic designer and producer (co-founder of Klasky Csupo).
 May 27: Jo Ann Harris, American actress (voice of Tina in Goober and the Ghost Chasers, Richard, Lewis and other various characters in The Simpsons, Felicia in What-a-Mess).
 May 29: Robert Axelrod, American actor (voice of Lord Zedd and Finster in Mighty Morphin Power Rangers, Microchip in Spider-Man, Wizardmon and Vademon in Digimon: Digital Monsters), (d. 2019).

June
 June 10: Kevin Corcoran, American actor (voice of the title character in Goliath II, Goofy Jr. in Aquamania), (d. 2015).
 June 11: Sherman Howard, American actor (voice of Derek Powers/Blight in Batman Beyond, the Preserver and Steppenwolf in Superman: The Animated Series, Van Pelt in Jumanji, Buzzard in Men in Black: The Series, Police Chief McBrusque  and Haggis in the An American Tail franchise, Oog-Oh in the Invader Zim episode "Planet Jackers", Captain Horoth in The Mummy episode "Time Before Time").
 June 15: Jim Varney, American actor and comedian (voice of Slinky Dog in Toy Story and Toy Story 2, Cookie in Atlantis: The Lost Empire, Mr. Gus Holder in Annabelle's Wish, Walt Evergreen in the Duckman episode "You've Come a Wrong Way, Baby", Cooder in The Simpsons episode "Bart Carny", Ephialtes in the Hercules episode "Hercules and the Muse of Dance"), (d. 2000).
 June 22: Meryl Streep, American actress (voice of Mrs. Fox in Fantastic Mr. Fox, Queen Ant in The Ant Bully, Jessica Lovejoy in The Simpsons episode "Bart's Girlfriend").
 June 27: Steve Rucker, American composer (Mister T, Disney Television Animation, Hanna-Barbera, Bionic Six, Visionaries: Knights of the Magical Light, DIC Entertainment, Little Nemo: Adventures in Slumberland, A Wish for Wings That Work, Captain Simian & the Space Monkeys, Salty's Lighthouse, Detention, ChalkZone).
 June 29:
 Roger Allers, American animator and film director (The Lion King, Open Season).
 Greg Burson, American actor (voice of Mr. DNA in Jurassic Park, voice replacement for all characters performed by Mel Blanc and Daws Butler), (d. 2008).
 Specific date unknown: Sally Cruikshank, American cartoonist, animator (Sesame Street, Quasi at the Quackadero), storyboard artist (SpongeBob SquarePants) and director (Quasi at the Quackadero).

July
 July 12: Judy Freudberg, American screenwriter (Sesame Street, An American Tail, The Land Before Time, Between the Lions), (d. 2012).
 July 22: Alan Menken, American composer, songwriter, conductor, music director and record director (Walt Disney Animation Studios).

August
 August 9: Don Vanderbeek, American background artist (Metro-Goldwyn-Mayer Animation, Johnny Bravo, Globehunters: An Around the World in 80 Days Adventure, Make Way for Noddy, Eight Crazy Nights, Candy Land: The Great Lollipop Adventure, The Simpsons), (d. 2014).
 August 16: Barbara Goodson, American actress (voice of Red Fraggle in Fraggle Rock: The Animated Series, Naota Nandaba in FLCL, Mother Talzin in Star Wars: The Clone Wars, Marianne Lenoir in Miraculous: Tales of Ladybug & Cat Noir, Goku in the Harmony Gold dub of Dragon Ball).
 August 18: Takeshi Shudo, Japanese screenwriter (Pokémon), (d. 2010).
 August 25: Gene Simmons, Israeli-American musician, singer and songwriter (voiced himself in Action League Now!, Family Guy, Glenn Martin DDS, The Fairly OddParents, and Scooby-Doo! and Kiss: Rock and Roll Mystery, Jessie in the King of the Hill episode "Reborn to Be Wild", Sea Monster in the SpongeBob SquarePants episode "20,000 Patties Under the Sea", creator of My Dad the Rock Star).
 August 28: Charles Rocket, American actor, comedian, musician and television new reporter (voice of Leo Lionheart Jr. in MGM sing-along videos, Firrikash in Titan A.E., Mission Control 1961 in Fly Me to the Moon, Frederick Fournier in The New Batman Adventures episode "Mean Seasons", narrator in Yu-Gi-Oh! The Movie: Pyramid of Light, Oli Slick Monster in The Adventures of Hyperman episode "Oceans a Leavin'", Crewcut in the Static Shock episode "She-Bang"), (d. 2005).
 August 30: Christopher Collins, American actor (voice of Starscream in The Transformers, Cobra Commander in G.I. Joe: A Real American Hero, Mr. Burns and Moe Szyslak in season 1 of The Simpsons), (d. 1994).
 August 31: Richard Gere, American actor (voice of Henry in Henry & Me, himself in The Simpsons episode "She of Little Faith").

September
 September 12: Guy Paul, American actor (additional voices in Courage the Cowardly Dog).
 September 16: Ed Begley Jr., American actor and environmentalist (voice of Donald Todd in Static Shock, Barry Brittle in the Duckman episode "Research and Destroy", Dr. Corso in the Batman Beyond episode "April Moon", himself in The Replacements episode "Dick Daring's All-Star Holiday Stunt Spectacular").
 September 19: Ernie Sabella, American actor (voice of Pumbaa in The Lion King franchise and House of Mouse).
 September 21: Irene Mecchi, American screenwriter (Walt Disney Animation Studios, Brave).
 September 28:
 Jim Henshaw, Canadian actor, screenwriter, and film and television producer (voice of Tenderheart Bear and Bright Heart Raccoon in Care Bears, Wicket W. Warrick in Ewoks).
 Vernee Watson-Johnson, American actress (voice of Dee Dee Sykes in Captain Caveman and the Teen Angels, Mrs. Watkins in Static Shock, Head Nurse in The Ant Bully, Lorraine Tate in Batman Beyond, Evelyn in the Craig of the Creek episode "Capture the Flag Part 1: The Candy", Lorna Freeman in The Boondocks episode "Invasion of the Katrinians", Selma in the A Pup Named Scooby-Doo episode "The Schnook Who Took My Comic Book").

October
 October 3: Norm Abram, American carpenter, writer and television host (guest starred in the Fetch! with Ruff Ruffman episode "This Old...Lemonade Stand", voiced himself in the Freakazoid! episode "Normadeus").
 October 8: Sigourney Weaver, American actress (voice of Frieda in Happily N'Ever After, Axiom Computer in WALL-E, the Narrator in The Tale of Despereaux, Lady Starblaster in Penn Zero: Part-Time Hero, The Myth Speaker in The Dark Crystal: Age of Resistance episode "End. Begin. All the Same.", Female Planet Express Ship in the Futurama episode "Love and Rocket", herself in Finding Dory).
 October 11: Sharman DiVono, American television writer (Richie Rich, Star Wars: Droids, G.I. Joe: A Real American Hero, Popples, DuckTales, Garfield and Friends, Bill & Ted's Excellent Adventures).
 October 25:
 Ross Bagdasarian Jr., American cartoonist, animator, actor, writer, producer and director, and son of Ross Bagdasarian.
 Bill Kovacs, American animator (Tron), (d. 2006).
 October 26: David Isaacs, American television producer and writer (The Simpsons).

November 
 November 5: Armin Shimerman, American actor (voice of General Skarr in Evil Con Carne and The Grim Adventures of Billy & Mandy, Zilius Zox in Justice League Action, Calculator in Batman: The Brave and the Bold, Slix Vigma in the Ben 10 episode "Grudge Match", Quark in the Star Trek: Lower Decks episode "Hear All, Trust Nothing").
 November 7: Judy Tenuta, American actress, comedian and musician (voice of Edna in Duckman, Black Widow in Space Ghost Coast to Coast, Mermaid, Waterskiing Babe, Black Widow and Waitress in Johnny Bravo, Tooth Fairy in the Nightmare Ned episode "Tooth or Consequences", Kelly in the Cow and Chicken episode "Buffalo Gals", Empanada in the Chowder episode "Mahjongg Night", Queen Porcina in the Mighty Magiswords episode "The Mystery of Loch Mess", herself in the Dr. Katz, Professional Therapist episode "Sticky Notes"), (d. 2022).
 November 27: Gerrit Graham, American actor (voice of Franklin Sherman in The Critic, Cat R. Waul in Fievel's American Tails, the Guardian in Gargoyles, Milo in The Tick episode "Armless But Not Harmless").
 November 28: Paul Shaffer, Canadian musician, actor, and comedian (voice of Hermes in Hercules and House of Mouse).
 November 29: Garry Shandling, American actor and comedian (voice of Verne in Over the Hedge, Ikki in The Jungle Book, Garry in the Dr. Katz, Professional Therapist episode "Sticky Notes", Captain Pat Lewellen in the Tom Goes to the Mayor episode "Couple's Therapy"), (d. 2016).

December 
 December 4: Jeff Bridges, American actor (voice of Prince Lir in The Last Unicorn, Ezekiel 'Big Z' Topanga/Geek in Surf's Up, the Aviator in The Little Prince).
 December 7: Jymn Magon, American television writer (Disney Television Animation).
 December 9: Tom Kite, American professional golfer and golf course architect (voiced himself in The Simpsons episode "Scenes from the Class Struggle in Springfield").
 December 12: Bill Nighy, English actor (voice of Whitey in Flushed Away, Rattlesnake Jake in Rango, Santa Claus in Arthur Christmas, Socrates in Norm of the North).
 December 15: Don Johnson, American actor, producer and singer (voice of Falcon in G.I. Joe: The Movie, Grandpa Whitey in Glenn Martin, DDS, Mr. McCormick in the American Dad! episode "Don't Look a Smith Horse in the Mouth", Johnny Bahama in the TripTank episode "The Director").
 December 18: Jeffrey Price, American screenwriter and producer (Who Framed Roger Rabbit, Shrek the Third).
 December 23: Judy Strangis, American actress (voice of Groovia in The Roman Holidays, Merilee in Butch Cassidy, Rota Ree in Wheelie and the Chopper Bunch).
 December 24: Ray Colcord, American composer (The Simpsons episode "Dead Putting Society"), (d. 2016).

Specific date unknown
 Tom Snyder, American animator (Squigglevision), writer and producer (Dr. Katz, Professional Therapist, Science Court).

Deaths

March
 March 6: Storm P., Danish comics artist, animator, illustrator, painter and comedian (Tre små mænd), dies at age 66.

October
 October 1: Buddy Clark, American singer (singer and narrator in Melody Time), dies at age 37.

December
 December 25: Leon Schlesinger, American film producer (Warner Bros. Cartoons), dies at age 65.

See also
List of anime by release date (1946–1959)

References

External links 
Animated works of the year, listed in the IMDb

 
1940s in animation